The Emperadores de Texcoco is a soccer club in the Mexican Football League Second Division in Texcoco, Estado de Mexico, Mexico. The Papalotla Stadium is their local ground.

External links
Official Website 
Mexican Football League Second Division Official Website 

Football clubs in the State of Mexico
2010 establishments in Mexico
Association football clubs established in 2010